Behave Yourself! is an Australian comedy game show which premiered on 4 July 2017 on the Seven Network. The series was produced by Eureka Productions and hosted by Darren McMullen. It featured comedians and celebrities competing to guess human responses and behaviour, based on experiments of behavioural expert and author Dan Ariely.

Cast

Host
Darren McMullen

Guests
 Anthony Lehmann
 Arj Barker
 Ash Pollard
 Barry Hall
 Ben Mingay
 Bonnie Lythgoe
 Brendan Fevola
 Cal Wilson
 Chloe Esposito
 Christie Whelan Browne
 Claire Hooper
 Denise Scott
 Ella Hooper
 Emily Taheny
 Gina Liano
 Guy Sebastian
 Heath Franklin
 Issa Schultz
 Jason Byrne
 Kate Langbroek
 Kerri-Anne Kennerley
 Kris Smith
 Larry Emdur
 Lawrence Mooney
 Liesel Jones
 Lucy Durack
 Matt Little
 Matt Parkinson
 Merv Hughes
 Michala Banas
 Natalie Bassingthwaighte
 Nazeem Hussain
 Nikki Osborne
 Sam Frost
 Shane Warne
 Stephen K. Amos
 Tegan Higginbotham
 Tim Ross
 Tom Ballard
 Virginia Gay

Episodes
Note: The winning team is listed in bold

Ratings

Notes

References

External links
 Official Website
 

2010s Australian game shows
2017 Australian television series debuts
2020s Australian game shows
2020 Australian television series endings
English-language television shows
Seven Network original programming
Television series by Eureka
Television shows set in Melbourne